Alfred Noyes (1835 – 30 September 1902) was an Australian cricketer. He played one first-class cricket match for Victoria in 1869.

See also
 List of Victoria first-class cricketers

References

1835 births
1902 deaths
Australian cricketers
Victoria cricketers
Sportspeople from Torquay
Melbourne Cricket Club cricketers